Michael S. Stich is an American television soap opera director. On-screen, Stich is credited with his real name on B&B, but as Mike Stich on Y&R.

Positions held
The Bold and the Beautiful
 Director (1987–present)

The Young and the Restless
 Occasional Director (2008, 2009)

Capitol
 Occasional Director (1985–1987)

Awards and nominations
Daytime Emmy Award
Nomination, 2008, Best Directing, The Bold and the Beautiful
Nomination, 2006, Best Directing, The Bold and the Beautiful
Nomination, 2002, Best Directing, The Bold and the Beautiful
Nomination, 2000, Best Directing, The Bold and the Beautiful

Directors Guild of America Award
Nomination, 2005, Best Directing, The Bold and the Beautiful (episode #4623)
Nomination, 2002, Best Directing, The Bold and the Beautiful (episode #3948)
Nomination, 2001, Best Directing, The Bold and the Beautiful (episode #3532)
Nomination, 1996, Best Directing, The Bold and the Beautiful (episode #2392)
Win, 1994, Best Directing, The Bold and the Beautiful (episode #1884)
Nomination, 1993, Best Directing, The Bold and the Beautiful
Win, 1991, Best Directing, The Bold and the Beautiful (episode #1103)

References

External links

American television directors
Year of birth missing (living people)
Living people
Directors Guild of America Award winners